George Ronald York (February 6, 1943 – June 22, 1965) and James Douglas Latham (April 21, 1942 – June 22, 1965) were an American spree killer duo who are the most recent people to be legally executed by the U.S. state of Kansas.

Killing spree

In late 1959, York and Latham met at Fort Hood, Texas, where both were privates in the United States Army. Latham had come to Fort Hood from Fort Carson, Colorado, where he had undergone basic training between May and July 1959. In May 1961 York and Latham (aged 18 and 19 at the time, respectively) went AWOL and decided to travel to York's hometown of Jacksonville, Florida. On May 26, they encountered Edward J. Guidroz in Mix, Louisiana. York and Latham badly beat him and stole his truck. On May 29, they met Althea Ottavio and Patricia Hewett, visitors from Georgia, in Jacksonville, where they had spent the day, shopping. According to the Federal Bureau of Investigation, York and Latham strangled both women with their own stockings, stole their money, and dumped the car they had been driving in a ditch.

On June 6, York and Latham attempted to rob a man in a Cadillac near Aiken, South Carolina, but the shots they fired at him missed, and their would-be victim escaped. On June 7, York and Latham murdered John Whittaker in Tullahoma, Tennessee. They took Whittaker's car and abandoned the first truck they had stolen. 

On June 8, York and Latham abandoned Whittaker's car near Troy, Illinois, and hitched a ride from a passerby named Albert Reed. They murdered Reed, dumped his body in a creek, and commandeered his car. 

Several miles outside of Edwardsville, Illinois, York and Latham killed gas station owner Martin Drenovac, and stole gas and money from the station. They continued their cross-country killing spree in Wallace, Kansas where on June 9, they shot 62-year-old Otto Ziegler to death, then took his wallet. On June 10 in Craig, Colorado, they killed 18-year-old motel maid Rachel Moyer, dumping her body and her few belongings in a ravine.

Arrest and confession

Later on June 10, 1961, York and Latham were arrested in Tooele County, Utah, for violating the federal National Motor Vehicle Theft Act, which prohibited transportation of a stolen vehicle across state lines within the United States. On June 11, York and Latham bragged to investigators that they had killed eight or nine people since they left Fort Hood. Police later learned that nine people were attacked by York and Latham, but two of them had survived. York and Latham claimed that being placed in a mixed-race unit in the army led to their desire to desert.

Execution loomed over the pair in a number of different states; had they been tried by Florida, Illinois or Tennessee, they would have most likely been electrocuted. Had they been tried by Colorado, they would have most likely been gassed. Ultimately, they were tried by Kansas, where hanging was the prescribed method of execution.

Trial and imprisonment
York and Latham were tried in Kansas for the killing of Ziegler. They were convicted by a jury and sentenced to death by Judge Benedict P. Cruise on November 8, 1961. While on death row in Kansas, York and Latham associated with Richard Hickock and Perry Smith, the subjects of Truman Capote's book In Cold Blood. York and Latham's crimes are described in Capote's book, and the men are portrayed in the work as flippant, snide, and lacking any degree of remorse.

Executions
York and Latham were executed by hanging at Kansas State Penitentiary (now known as Lansing Correctional Facility) on June 22, 1965.  Latham was executed first, followed by York. Latham's last words were "I'm not mad at anybody." York's last words were "There is nothing to say but that I'm going to heaven." 

Since their execution, no one has been put to death by the state of Kansas, although a number of prisoners have been sentenced to death. York and Latham were also the last persons executed by hanging in the United States until 1993, when the state of Washington hanged Westley Allan Dodd.

Victims
May 26: Edward J. Guidroz (survived)
May 29: Althea Ottavio and Patricia Hewett
June 6: Unnamed man (survived)
June 7: John Whittaker
June 8: Albert Reed and Martin Drenovac
June 9: Otto Zeigler
June 10: Rachel Moyer

See also
 Capital punishment in Kansas
 List of most recent executions by jurisdiction
 List of people executed in Kansas

References

Bibliography

External links
 
 
 

1942 births
1943 births
Criminal duos
1965 deaths
20th-century executions by Kansas
American spree killers
20th-century executions of American people
Executed spree killers
People convicted of murder by Kansas
People executed by Kansas by hanging
People executed for murder
United States Army soldiers